Santa Tereza is a Belo Horizonte Metro station on Line 1. It was added in December 1993 to already operating line. The station is located between Santa Efigênia and Horto.

References

Belo Horizonte Metro stations
1993 establishments in Brazil
Railway stations opened in 1993